The railway passenger service between Perth and Fremantle was closed from 2 September 1979 to 29 July 1983 by the Charles Court government of Western Australia.

The closure was deeply unpopular and became a key campaign issue in the 1982 state government election. Following a change of government, passenger services resumed on 29 July 1983. The re-opening of the railway was the beginning of a shift in metropolitan transport policy that saw bipartisan support for the revitalisation and expansion of Perth's passenger railway system. The campaign against the closure of the railway was led by Peter Newman, a local Government councillor and environmental scientist.

Background 

Perth’s passenger rail services were believed to have been in serious decline throughout the 1960s and 1970s with reports of passenger numbers falling as commuters switched from public transport to cars and employment moved out of the central city. Calls by various stakeholders for investment in the electrification of the system had been ignored.

The 1955 Stephenson-Hepburn Plan had recommended the expansion of the existing rail network into the northern suburbs, however this recommendation was not implemented in the 1963 Metropolitan Region Scheme. Commencing with the 1970 Corridor Plan, successive government reports throughout the 1970s had recommended the closure of the existing rail lines and their replacement with bus services, but these recommendations were not acted on by the government at the time.

Successive state governments had reduced investment in both passenger and freight rail services over the same period of time with the Court government accelerating the closure of regional services in the late 1970s. This included Albany and Mullewa passenger services in 1976 and 1978 respectively and various freighting services over the same period. Dependent as they were on aging railway stock (some of which dated to the 1930s), passenger rail services were relatively uncomfortable and attracted a declining ridership.

As the rolling stock neared the end of its lifespan, the government of the day was required to consider either a substantial capital works program, or the cessation of passenger services entirely. John Knox, appointed to the Department of Transport in the early 1970s was a key player in the process of consolidating and closing rail services. When the closure of the railway was mooted in 1975, 40,000 people signed a petition against it. It was again proposed by the Minister for Transport in October 1977, however Charles Court went to the 1977 state election with a promise to keep the line open.

Announcement of closure (May 1979 – September 1979) 
Following an overseas investigation, George Shea, head of the Metropolitan Transport Trust reach the view that electrification of the railway was unviable in a City of less than 3 million residents and recommended as such to the government. In May 1979, the Court government announced the imminent cessation of passenger railway services along the Fremantle line and the replacement of public transport services with a fleet of articulated buses. Some rolling stock was to be transferred to the Armadale and Midland lines, with a review of the closure to occur within three years.

The justification for the cessation of the railway service was that it was uneconomic, inefficient and inflexible in comparison to equivalent bus services. The government pointed to declining passenger numbers and an increase in the annual cost of providing rail services in comparison to buses. The Minister for Transport was quoted as saying it was "futile" to oppose the decision.

The decision was applauded in some quarters and was supported by most transportation experts, but was met with immediate community and local government opposition. Academic and local government councillor Peter Newman and 11 others formed the Friends of the Railways advocacy group for the purpose of opposing the government policy.

Within three months of formation, the Friends of the Railway had 400 members. By May, Friends of the Railway, led by Liberal member for Subiaco Tom Dadour, had gathered 100,000 signatures on a petition against the closure and prepared a detailed report rebutting arguments in favour of the railway closure and laying out an alternative proposal for the electrification of the system. This garnered widespread media coverage and as protests grew, comparisons were made to the community opposition around the demolition of the Pensioners Barracks. Under pressure from the community and local governments including Fremantle and Subiaco the Minister for Transport announced he would review the submission and present it before cabinet. The Minister requested additional information from Friends of the Railway, which they provide by June.

Pressure continued to grow, with the Sunday Independent reporting market research that found 80% of metropolitan voters were against the closure, including 70% of voters who voted Liberal in the last election. Friends of the Railways sought permission from the government to take surveys of passengers on the railways, but the request was denied.

On 27 July, the alternative transport proposal was formally rejected by cabinet and the government reiterated its intention to closure the railway on 2 September. This leads to a formal request in August from the railway unions for a parliamentary inquiry, which was denied.

On 6 August, Friends of the Railway was the recipient of leaked internal documents from Westrail indicating that the Department of Transport had suppressed reports that contradicted the government's position that electrification of the line was uneconomical. The Minister initially denied the existence of the report, before acknowledging it the next day when photographic evidence was printed by the Daily News.

On 17 August it was alleged that the Government disrupted a public Friends of the Railway meeting at the Cottesloe Civic Centre by bussing in Liberal party members to stifle debate.

Later in August, a public protest of up to 3000 people marched through Perth and the closure was debated extensively in the Legislative council with the government alleging that “subversive” actors were funding Friends of the Railway, and the opposition accusing the government of a “systematic dismantling” of railway services. In their defence, the government claimed to be investing in rail along the Armadale and Midland lines, but that the Fremantle line lacked the population density to support the services.

Closure (September 1979 – July 1983) 

On 1 September an estimated 1200 people turned out to watch the last train to Fremantle. The following day, public transport services were replaced by 17 articulated buses.

Despite widespread cross-political dissatisfaction with the railway closure the government justified the policy as part of an overall investment in public transport and promised that it would be subject to review with three years. The continuation of freight services ensured that the railway line remained operational and so, in spite of a clear swing to Labor, the government won the 1980 election.

Over the next three years, the replacement bus services failed to attract comparable passenger numbers to the closed railway line. Peter Newman suggests a decline of around 30%. Later reports found total passenger numbers on the rail network bottoming out at 58 million during this time period.

In 1982, following the review of the closure, the government released Transport 2000: A Perth Study. This report reaffirmed the government policy and recommended that the Fremantle line remains closed.

With the government taking a firm position on the railway closure the Opposition under Brian Burke promised to reopen the line if Labor won the election.

Change of government and re-opening (1983) 
The Labor opposition won the 1983 state government election, entering government for the first time since 1974. In May of the same year Cabinet agreed to honour their election commitment to reopen the Fremantle railway.

On 29 July 1983 the Fremantle rail reopened with passenger numbers restored to their pre-1979 levels. At this point the infrastructure and rolling stock was in such a poor state that the government was compelled to investigate the immediate electrification of the entire line, a program that commenced in 1986 and concluded in 1991.

References 

Fremantle
History of rail transport in Western Australia
1979 disestablishments in Australia